Médouneu  is a small town in northern Gabon. It is the capital of the Haut-Ntem Department in Woleu-Ntem province. As of 2009 it had an estimated population of 2,445.

The town is served by Médouneu Airport.

References

Populated places in Woleu-Ntem Province